Two ships of the French Navy have borne the name Commerce de Marseille ("Commerce of Marseille") in honour of the congregation of the merchants of Marseille:

French Navy ship names